Vongo was a video on demand service, owned by Liberty Media/The Weinstein Company's Starz Entertainment, parent company of the Starz network, that allowed users to download and view movies for a fixed price per month. As of August 1, 2008, Vongo stopped accepting new subscribers and was discontinued on September 30, 2008.

Service provided 
"Vongo" was a service that allowed users to rent movies by download.  It provided access to the Starz television channel, and contained a small library of movies.  It also included a Pay Per View option.  Starz Vongo had a small and growing selection of titles; more movies added weekly; satisfactory video quality; compatible with Portable Media Center 2.0 devices; some movies available with DVD-like bonus materials.

In October 2007, Starz Entertainment acquired Internet distribution rights for more than 100 feature films from Screen Media Ventures including films starring Will Ferrell, Angelina Jolie, Ralph Fiennes, Peter O'Toole and Mariel Hemingway.

The statistical make-up of Vongo video offerings during January 2008:
 1526 titles provided
 88% provided for download in portable format
 9% provided in widescreen format
 8% provided with a Pay-Per-View fee
 By Genre: 40% Drama, 24% Comedy, 13% Action, 12% Westerns, 10% Music, 8% Family/Kids, 8% Romantic, 8% Sci-Fi/Horror (Note: same title can appear in multiple genres)
 By Rating: 25% R, 17% TV14, 14% TVPG, 13% PG-13, 12% TVMA, 11% PG, 4% TVG, 3% G
 53% are rated under the MPAA rating system
 47% are rated for TV broadcast

Technical overview 
Vongo used Adobe/Macromedia Flash software. The software was compatible with PCs running Windows XP or Vista and eventually supported Windows XP X64 and Vista X64 edition. Movies could be transferred and played on up to three devices but could not be transferred to external drives or other storage media.

Movies downloaded through Vongo were viewable within the confines of a certain time period; most newer movies were available for 4–6 months, while other programming could be as long as 12–24 months.  Once a movie expired, it was automatically deleted from the user's hard drive. There was an average download time of 30 to 40 minutes on a 90-minute movie.

Vongo also ran inside Windows Media Center.  Vongo films were then available on Microsoft's Xbox 360 and other Windows Media Center Extenders.

Vongo had a tiered support structure.  Initial support was provided through the website through "Ask Vongo" which provided answers from the support knowledge base.

Criticism
Vongo was preinstalled on HP and Compaq Computers during the time of its existence, and users found the program to be nearly impossible to remove without making registry edits.  This difficulty has led to its classification as a virus by many users.

Vongo also tried to keep accessing the Internet every two minutes if it is blocked.  When this was combined with design errors in the Symantec firewall, which did not support a "Block Always" choice, a user could end up with 720 Security Alert: Medium risk messages for each elapsed 24-hour period.  These had to be cleared before the Symantec firewall came up to date on current queries.  Under certain circumstances, this could completely block usage of web browsers until this queue was cleared or the machine was rebooted.

References

External links
 Home page
 Extremetech review of Vongo
 CNET review of Vongo
 Overview of Vongo 2.0 with Vista and Xbox 360 Support
  Vongo Application

Subscription video on demand services
Defunct subscription services
Defunct video on demand services
Products and services discontinued in 2008
Former Liberty Media subsidiaries